Helmut Ditsch (born July 6, 1962) is an Argentine  painter. Ditsch's work focuses on extreme natural phenomena such as mountains, desert, ice, and water.

Life 
He was born in Villa Ballester, in the province of Buenos Aires, to grandparents from Austria and Germany, including northern Italian origins, who had immigrated to Argentina in 1920. The early death of the artist's mother, and with it the theme of life and death, impacted his work. At the age of eight he was introduced to the two vast Argentine landscapes, the Pampas grasslands and the Andes mountain range, which have influenced his life and work. After graduating from Hölters Schule he started to pursue a career as a painter.

In 1982 Ditsch served in the Argentine Navy during the Falklands War. In 1983 he began working as a freelance artist. The same year he founded the music band 357 MAGNUM and shot his first film in Mendoza.

In 1988 Helmut Ditsch moved to Vienna, Austria, to begin his education at the Academy of Fine Arts Vienna. He concluded his studies in painting in 1993 and graduated with honors. In the following year he opened his studio near Vienna. Around this time Helmut Ditsch became acquainted with and befriended Italian mountaineer Reinhold Messner in Meran, with whom he has since collaborated on numerous occasions.

In order to study the glacial ice, Helmut Ditsch undertook a journey in 1995 to Patagonia. In 1998 he spent many weeks isolated in the Austrian Alps to study for his painting Das Gebirge ("The Mountains"). In 2000, he moved his studio to Ireland, where he has lived and worked since. In 2006, Helmut Ditsch presented his book The Triumph of Nature as part of a solo exhibition at the Feria International del Libro Show in Argentina.

In 2008, he founded the HELMUT DITSCH FAN FABRICA DE ARTE NACIONAL, a transparent laboratory for art, music, philosophy and high technology design.

In 2010, the sale of the painting Das Meer II for US$865.000 made Ditsch the most expensive artist in Argentina. The same year he began his exhibition tour "GIRA NACIONAL Y POPULAR" (so far in: Santa Fe, Paraná, Rosario, Vienna, Mar del Plata, Mendoza). The exhibitions have an inclusive character and take place at public spaces with free entry.

In 2016 the painting Cosmigonon was sold for the record price of US$1.500.000.

In June 2016 Helmut Ditsch began to use his creative talent in music and recorded his first album "Del Final de los Tiempos".  The work of the artist includes music, lyrics, arrangement and voice. He also conducts an orchestra while playing the piano. Helmut Ditsch argues that his symphonic poems are the melody which you can also find on canvas. “I conceive my paintings through music. In fact the colours have a tonal frequency. Therefore every time when I paint, I create a music score.’’

In 2017 Helmut Ditsch begins his biggest painting ever. On a 2 x 12 metres big canvas he paints the famous Argentinian glacier Perito Moreno.

Selected works 
 Cycle IV, 1991
 Über dem Güßfeldt-Gletscher, 1993
 Cerro Ameghino, 1994
 Aconcagua, 1994
 Klagenfurt Becken, 1996
 Death Valley IV, 1996
 Mountain Range, 1998–1999
 Death Valley ?, 1995–2000
 The Answer, 1997–2000
 Ötscher, 1998–2000
 Descalza, 1999–2000
 Point Of No Return, 2001
 Das Eis und die vergängliche Ewigkeit, 2001–2002
 The ten commandments II, 2002
 Los Hielos, 2002
 Cosmigonon, 2002
 Traunsee, 2003
 Das Meer I, 2004
 Cafayate, 2004
 Perito Moreno, 2004
 Also Sprach Zarathustra, 2004
 Das Meer II, 2005
 Point Of No Return II, 2005
 K2, 2006

Awards 

 1990 Master Class Award of Academy of Fine Arts Vienna, Austria
 1993 Appreciation Prize of the Federal Ministry of Science and Research Austria
 1997 Special prize of the Bau Holding Kunstforum
 2010 Honorary Citizen of the General San Martín Partido, Province of Buenos Aires, Argentina
 2012 Cultural Award "Dr. Arturo Jauretche"
 2012 Honorary master's degree from the Universidad Nacional de General San Martín (UNSAM)

References

Sources 
 Carl Aigner: The Triumph of Nature. The Paintings of Helmut Ditsch. Prestel Munich, Berlin, London, New York, 2005,  
 Carl Aigner: Helmut Ditsch: The Triumph of Painting. Prestel Munich, Berlin, London, New York, 2009,

External links 
 Official website

1962 births
Living people
Austrian artists
People from San Martín, Buenos Aires
Argentine painters
Argentine male painters
Academy of Fine Arts Vienna alumni
Argentine people of Austrian descent
Argentine people of German descent
Argentine people of Italian descent